Berlingske Media (formerly Det Berlingske Officin A/S) is a Danish Copenhagen-based media company that owns many newspapers, websites and radio stations. The main newspaper in the company, Berlingske Tidende, now Berlingske, is one of the world's oldest newspapers, having published its first issue on 3 January 1749. The company is run by Anders Krab-Johansen, former CEO and editor in chief at Børsen.

History
The company was founded in 1749 when Ernst Henrich Berling first published Kjøbenhavnske Danske Post-Tidender (later Berlingske Tidende). The company was owned by the Berling family until 1982 when it experienced economical difficulties and was saved by an investment from Mærsk Mc-Kinney Møller. He sold his shares in the company in 1999. From  2000 to 2006, the company was owned by the Orkla Group, a Norwegian conglomerate which purchased 76% of Det Berlingske Officin publishing group' stock for €209-million.

In 2006, Orkla sold its multi-national publishing and media activities, including Det Berlingske Officin, to the British company Mecom Group for €900 million. The company name was changed to "Berlingske Media" to reflect its focus on websites.

In June 2014, Mecom sold Berlingske Media to the Belgian mediahouse De Persgroep (now DPG Media).

After DPG Media's takeover, Berlingske Media is focusing on the four main brands; Berlingske, B.T., Weekendavisen and Radio24syv.

Ownerships

Brands
 Berlingske formerly Berlingske Tidende
 B.T.
 B.T.metro (70% and Tamedia 30%)
 Weekendavisen
 Radio24syv (70% and People Group 30%)

References

External links
 Berlingske Media website; Ownerships overview
  Ketupa Media Profiles: Norsk Orkla/Det Berlingske Officin; Mecom
 

 
Mass media companies of Denmark
Newspaper companies of Denmark
Mass media companies based in Copenhagen
Danish companies established in 1749
Companies based in Copenhagen Municipality